Odette is a 1934 Italian drama film based upon the play by Victorien Sardou, directed by Jacques Houssin and Giorgio Zambon and starring Francesca Bertini, Samson Fainsilber, Jacques Maury. Bertini had appeared in two previous versions of the story, the first a 1916 silent film Odette.

Cast
 Francesca Bertini as Odette  
 Samson Fainsilber as Dario d'Alhucemas  
 Jacques Maury as Philippe d'Armande 
 Claude May as Jacqueline  
 Yolanda Marcus as Sarah 
 May Muriel as Mitza  
 Léon Walther as Il conte Hubert de Clermont-Latour  
 Henri Trévoux as Béchamel  
 Maurice Maillot as Jean de Bordes  
 Henri Fabert as Morizet

References

Bibliography 
 Goble, Alan. The Complete Index to Literary Sources in Film. Walter de Gruyter, 1999.

External links 
 

1934 films
1934 drama films
Italian drama films
1930s Italian-language films
Italian films based on plays
Films based on works by Victorien Sardou
Italian black-and-white films
1930s Italian films